John Thomas Keane (died 22 May 1946) was an Irish politician. He was an independent member of Seanad Éireann from 1944 to 1946. He was elected to the 5th Seanad in 1944 by the Labour Panel. He died in office in 1946, and Frederick Hawkins was elected to fill the vacancy.

References

Year of birth missing
1946 deaths
Members of the 5th Seanad
Independent members of Seanad Éireann